Senator Mueller may refer to:

Otto Mueller (politician) (1875–1973), Wisconsin State Senate
Walter H. Mueller (c. 1925–2011), Missouri State Senate

See also
Lauro Müller (1863–1926), Senator of the Republic in Brazil
Filinto Müller (1900–1973), Brazilian Senator from Mato Grosso